Gorod may refer to:

 Gord (archaeology), a Slavic word meaning "town" that appears in numerous Slavic toponyms – see: Gorod (toponymy), Horod, or Grad (toponymy)
 Gorod (band), a French technical death metal band
 Gorod-Makit, a peak in Amur Oblast, Russia

See also
 Gulyay-gorod, a mobile "walled town" used for defense on the featureless steppe
 Gord (disambiguation)